Patnitop is a hill station, located, between Ramban Town and  Udhampur city in the Ramban district of Jammu and Kashmir, India. It is in located on the Jammu-Srinagar National Highway (which is part of National Highway 44, formerly 1A),  from Jammu, on the way from Udhampur to Srinagar. The river Chenab flows in close proximity to this location. Patnitop lies in District Ramban of Jammu And Kashmir

Dr. Syama Prasad Mookerjee Tunnel

Snowfall and avalanche in winter at Patnitop used to obstruct the Jammu-Srinagar National Highway a few times every winter and causes long queues of vehicles, sometimes for days. These problems were mitigated by the opening of the Dr. Syama Prasad Mookerjee Tunnel. At , it is India's longest road tunnel.

The Patnitop Ropeway

Skyview Patnitop is India's highest ropeway and the largest Indo-French collaboration in mountain infrastructure development was built in a record time of 2.4 years under the Public-Private Partnership (PPP) model. The ropeway started its commercial operations on July 20 ,2020 . A month after starting its commercial operation, the Skyview Patnitop by Empyrean, an initiative by Empyrean Skyview Projects Private Limited (ESPPL), was awarded the best adventure tourism destination 2019 .It features India's highest ropeway with over 65 meters of ground clearance and the longest span of 849 meters between eight towers . The Ropeway reduces the travel time between sanget & patnitop to 15 minutes from the earlier 1.5 hours .

Gallery

References

External links
 Patnitop Development Authority, Official website
 PatniTop Attractions
 Trekking in PatniTop by INDITRAMP 
Geography of Jammu and Kashmir
Tourist attractions in Udhampur district
Jammu and Kashmir
Ramban district